"Flying Home" is a jazz and jump blues composition written by Benny Goodman and Lionel Hampton with lyrics by Sid Robin.

Background
It was reportedly developed while Hampton was in the Benny Goodman band. A gig in 1939 required the band to fly from Los Angeles to Atlantic City, the first time Hampton had flown. He began whistling a tune while waiting for the plane to taxi. Goodman asked him what it was, and Hampton said, "I don't know. We can call it 'Flying Home,' I guess." Hampton later confessed that the tune was a way for him to keep his mind off of the impending flight. The Goodman Quartet played the tune for the first time that night; later that year Goodman recorded the first version of the song, featuring a memorable solo from pioneering guitarist Charlie Christian. Hampton liked the song so much that it became his theme once he left Goodman.

Recordings
It was first recorded by the Benny Goodman Sextet on November 6, 1939, featuring solos by Hampton and Charlie Christian. Several other groups recorded the tune. 
In 1942, Lionel Hampton and His Orchestra recorded the song with an epic-length tenor saxophone solo by nineteen-year-old Illinois Jacquet. The song became the climax for live shows, with Jacquet expected to repeat his famous solo, note-by-note.
On the recording of May 26, 1942, Hampton takes a brief intro (as if to show whose band this is) and the band plays the melody for 16 bars. The vibraphonist takes the bridge and the ensemble plays a catchy riff to finish the chorus. Jacquet then takes a two-chorus solo that would make musical history. His first chorus is fairly straightforward, playing with a sound and a melodic logic that is influenced by Lester Young. The second chorus finds him repeating the same note 12 times on every other beat, a hallmark of early rhythm and blues of the mid-to-late 1940s. After playing another phrase, he repeats the same note a dozen more times before ending the chorus. The full ensemble joins in for 16 bars and for the bridge Hampton and his lead trumpeter Ernie Royal exchange phrases with Royal ending with an impressive high note. The band returns for eight bars, Hampton and Royal repeat their routine, and the trumpeter screams over the ensemble as the band romps for the final eight bars that conclude the performance.
 Singer Chris Connor recorded the song for Atlantic Records and released it as a single in 1959. 
Harry James recorded a version in 1965 on his album New Versions of Down Beat Favorites (MGM).
Ella Fitzgerald recorded a seven-minute-plus version for the album Digital III at Montreux (1979). Lullabies of Birdland includes another version by Fitzgerald that The New York Times called "one of the most influential vocal jazz records of the decade... Where other singers, most notably Louis Armstrong, had tried similar improvisation, no one before Miss Fitzgerald employed the technique with such dazzling inventiveness."
There is a 2:30-minute version of the song in the 1992 film A League Of Their Own and on the movie score album by Hans Zimmer.  Performers were not credited.

Accolades and other uses
"Flying Home" is mentioned in The Autobiography of Malcolm X (1965) and a Lindy Hop dance arrangement is featured in the film Malcolm X (1992).
In 1996, it won a Grammy Hall of Fame Award.
Ralph Ellison named a short story (1944) after the song that became the title of a posthumous collection.
 Flying Home (1978) is the title of a novel by Morris Lurie who uses references to jazz in his stories.

References

1939 songs
1942 songs
Jazz compositions
Grammy Hall of Fame Award recipients
Benny Goodman songs